The 2019 German Darts Open was the fourth of thirteen PDC European Tour events on the 2019 PDC Pro Tour. The tournament took place at Saarlandhalle, Saarbrücken, Germany, from 26–28 April 2019. It featured a field of 48 players and £140,000 in prize money, with £25,000 going to the winner.

Max Hopp was the defending champion after defeating Michael Smith 8–7 in the final of the 2018 tournament, but he was defeated 6–3 by John Henderson in the second round.

Steve Beaton hit the third nine-dart finish of the 2019 European Tour during his first round match with Kirk Shepherd.

Brendan Dolan averaged 105.54 in his first round defeat to Jamie Hughes, a European Tour record for a first round losing average.

Michael van Gerwen won his 31st European Tour title, defeating Ian White 8–3 in the final.

Prize money
This is how the prize money is divided:

 Seeded players who lose in the second round do not receive this prize money on any Orders of Merit.

Qualification and format
The top 16 entrants from the PDC ProTour Order of Merit on 5 March will automatically qualify for the event and will be seeded in the second round.

The remaining 32 places will go to players from six qualifying events – 18 from the UK Tour Card Holder Qualifier (held on 15 March), six from the European Tour Card Holder Qualifier (held on 15 March), two from the West & South European Associate Member Qualifier (held on 19 April), four from the Host Nation Qualifier (held on 25 April), one from the Nordic & Baltic Associate Member Qualifier (held on 1 February) and one from the East European Associate Member Qualifier (held on 20 January).

From 2019, the Host Nation, Nordic & Baltic and East European Qualifiers will only be available to non-tour card holders. Any tour card holders from the applicable regions will have to play the main European Qualifier.

The following players will take part in the tournament:

Top 16
  Michael van Gerwen (champion)
  Ian White (runner-up)
  Gerwyn Price (quarter-finals)
  Peter Wright (third round)
  Mensur Suljović (quarter-finals)
  Rob Cross (semi-finals)
  Adrian Lewis (quarter-finals)
  James Wade (third round)
  Jonny Clayton (second round)
  Max Hopp (second round)
  Joe Cullen (third round)
  Daryl Gurney (third round)
  Dave Chisnall (semi-finals)
  Simon Whitlock (second round)
  Darren Webster (third round)
  Jermaine Wattimena (second round)

UK Qualifier
  Ted Evetts  (second round)
  David Pallett (second round)
  Steve West (first round)
  James Wilson (first round)
  Stephen Bunting (first round)
  Steve Beaton (second round)
  Steve Lennon (second round)
  Chris Dobey  (second round)
  John Henderson (third round)
  Kyle Anderson (first round)
  Kirk Shepherd (first round)
  Mickey Mansell (second round)
  Wayne Jones (first round)
  Nathan Aspinall (quarter-finals)
  Luke Humphries (second round)
  James Richardson (second round)
  Brendan Dolan (first round)
  Jamie Hughes (third round)

European Qualifier
  Vincent Kamphuis (first round)
  Dimitri Van den Bergh (second round)
  Gabriel Clemens (first round)
  Jeffrey de Zwaan (second round)
  Vincent van der Meer (second round)
  Raymond van Barneveld (third round)

West/South European Qualifier
  Mike De Decker (first round)
  Jerry Hendriks (second round)

Host Nation Qualifier
  Thomas Köhnlein (first round)
  Karsten Koch (first round)
  Lukas Wenig (first round)
  Kevin Münch (first round)

Nordic & Baltic Qualifier
  Dennis Nilsson (first round)

East European Qualifier
  Pavel Jirkal (first round)

Draw

References 

2019 PDC Pro Tour
2019 PDC European Tour
2019 in German sport
April 2019 sports events in Germany